Ed Reavy (1897–1988) was an Irish-American musician and composer of numerous traditional Irish dance tunes. Born in the town of Barnagrove (aka Barnagrow, Barnagrows or Barr na gCnó), Knappagh, County Cavan, he emigrated to Philadelphia in 1912 where he settled in the Irish-American enclave of Corktown (now part of Powelton Village). Except for two visits back to Ireland, he remained in the Philadelphia area for the remainder of his life.

Biography
Reavy was a fiddler, and recorded in 1927 for the Victor record label, including two reels ("The Boys of the Lough" and "Tom Clark's Fancy") and two hornpipes ("The Donegal" and "The Cliff"). More than one hundred of his compositions have been published, and his sons have estimated that there may be more than five hundred in total.  

His most famous tune may be "The Hunter's House".  

His compositions and style of fiddling found their way back to Ireland and were very influential in the development of modern Irish Traditional Music.

Reavy was president of the Irish Musicians' Association of America.  

In 2000, he was posthumously awarded the title "Composer of the Century" by an Irish-American organization.

References

Further reading
"The Companion to Irish Traditional Music", Fintan Vallely, NYU Press, 1999, 

1897 births
1988 deaths
20th-century American composers
20th-century American male musicians
20th-century classical composers
20th-century American violinists
Composers for fiddle
Irish emigrants to the United States (before 1923)
Irish fiddlers
Irish songwriters
Musicians from County Cavan